Castrella is a genus of flatworms belonging to the family Dalyelliidae.

Species:
 Castrella alba Luther, 1955 
 Castrella cylindrica Riedel, 1932

References

Platyhelminthes